Hernesniemi is a Finnish surname. Notable people with the surname include:

Juha Hernesniemi (born 1947), Finnish neurosurgeon and professor
Sanna Hernesniemi (born 1971), Finnish sprinter

Finnish-language surnames